Omiodes leucostrepta is a moth in the family Crambidae. It was described by British entomologist Edward Meyrick in 1886. It is found in Tonga and Fiji.

References

Moths described in 1886
leucostrepta